Events from the year 1743 in Sweden

Incumbents
 Monarch – Frederick I

Events

 March - The peasant estate in the Riksdag of the Estates support Crown Prince Frederick of Denmark before Adolf Frederik of Holstein-Gottorp, as candidate to the post of heir to the Swedish throne. 
 May - Three of the four estates in the  Riksdag of the Estates: the nobility, the clergy and the burghers, offers to support the Russian candidate as heir to the Swedish throne in exchange for favorable peace terms with Russia. 
 11 June - Dalecarlian Rebellion (1743). A rebel army of peasants march toward Stockholm to prevent the election of Adolf Frederik of Holstein-Gottorp as heir to the Swedish throne and punish those responsible for the war.
 16 June - Preliminary peace between Sweden and Russia. 
 22 June - The rebel army reach Stockholm, where they are dispersed by the military.  
 23 June - Adolf Frederik of Holstein-Gottorp, the candidate of Empress Elizabeth I of Russia, is elected heir to the Swedish throne. 
 July - Execution of Henrik Magnus von Buddenbrock.
 7 August - Treaty of Åbo.
 September – Denmark-Norway threatens to declare war because their candidate,  Crown Prince Frederick of Denmark, was not chosen as heir to the Swedish throne, which result in Sweden having to accept a Russian protective force in Sweden. 
 - Den sörgande Turtur-dufvan by Hedvig Charlotta Nordenflycht.
 - Elisabeth Christina von Linné publishes her discovery of the Tropaeolum majus.

Births

 
 1 February - Johan Christopher Toll, soldier (died 1817) 
 April 17 - Johan Törnström, sculptor  (died 1828) 
 
 11 November - Carl Peter Thunberg, naturalist and an apostle of Carl Linnaeus (died 1828) 

 15 December - Eva Helena Löwen, socialite, agent and royal favorite (died 1813)

Deaths

 
 July - Execution of Henrik Magnus von Buddenbrock, Lieutenant General (born 1685) 
 22 march - Emerentia von Düben, royal favorite (born 1669) 
 23 September - Erik Benzelius the younger, theologian (born 1675) 
 20 October - Michael Dahl, painter (born 1659)

References

 
Years of the 18th century in Sweden
Sweden